The Beijing TV Center is a 41-floor, -tall skyscraper completed in 2006 located in Beijing, China. It was designed by Japanese company Nikken Sekkei. It looks similar to the Commerzbank Tower in Frankfurt.

The building is home to the Beijing Television, not the CCTV Headquarters which is another building nearby.

See also

 List of tallest buildings in Beijing
Media buildings in Beijing
 China Media Group Headquarters
 Central Radio & TV Tower
 CCTV Headquarters
 Beijing Television Cultural Center
 Phoenix Center

References

External links

Emporis.com – Beijing TV Centre
SkyscraperPage.com - Beijing TV Centre
Beijing Television Center, Nikken Sekkei

Buildings and structures in Chaoyang District, Beijing
Commercial buildings completed in 2006
2006 establishments in China